Nicole Mitchell (born 11 July 1983) is a Bermudian road cyclist. She won both the road race and the time trial at the Bermudan National Road Championships in 2014. She competed at the 2014 Commonwealth Games achieving a 21st position in the time trial, out of 32 riders. On April 14, 2014 she earned the silver medal at the 16th Annual Colossal Cave in Tucson, Arizona.

Major results

2009
 3rd Road race, National Road Championships
2010
 National Road Championships
2nd Time trial
2nd Road race
2012
 National Road Championships
1st Time trial
1st Road race
2013
 1st Time trial, National Road Championships
2014
 National Road Championships
1st Time trial
1st Road race
2015
 3rd Time trial, National Road Championships
2016
 National Road Championships
2nd Time trial
2nd Road race
2017
 Island Games
1st  Team criterium
2nd  Team road race
3rd  Road race
 National Road Championships
1st Road race
1st Criterium
2nd Time trial
2018
 National Road Championships
2nd Time trial
2nd Road race
2019
 National Road Championships
2nd Time trial
2nd Road race
2021
 National Road Championships
1st Time trial
2nd Road race

References

External links
 

Bermudian female cyclists
Living people
1983 births
Place of birth missing (living people)
Cyclists at the 2014 Commonwealth Games
Commonwealth Games competitors for Bermuda
Cyclists at the 2019 Pan American Games
Pan American Games competitors for Bermuda